is a former Japanese football player.

Club career
Maeda was born in Fukuoka Prefecture on August 1, 1981. After graduating from high school, he joined J1 League club Avispa Fukuoka based in his local in 2000. However he could not play at all in the match. In 2001, he moved to J2 League club Oita Trinita. On June 20, 2001, he debuted in J.League Cup (v Júbilo Iwata). However However he could only play this match. In 2002, he moved to Professor Miyazaki (later Sun Miyazaki). Although he played many matches, the club was relegated to Regional Leagues from 2003. In the middle of 2003, he moved to Regional Leagues club New Wave Kitakyushu. He retired end of 2004 season.

Club statistics

References

External links

1981 births
Living people
Association football people from Fukuoka Prefecture
Japanese footballers
J1 League players
J2 League players
Japan Football League players
Avispa Fukuoka players
Oita Trinita players
Estrela Miyazaki players
Giravanz Kitakyushu players
Association football midfielders